Anolis planiceps, commonly known as the golden-scaled anole, orange-fanned leaf-litter anole, or goldenscale anole, is a species of lizard in the family Dactyloidae. The species is found in Venezuela, Guyana, Brazil, and Trinidad.

Habitat

Description

Reproduction
A. planiceps is oviparous.

Etymology
The synonym, A. eewi, was named in honor of American herpetologist Ernest Edward Williams, a wordplay on his initials, E.E.W.

References

Further reading
D'Angiolella AB, Gamble T, Avila-Pires TCS, Colli GR, Noonan BP, Vitt LJ (2011). "Anolis chrysolepis Duméril & Bibron, 1837 (Squamata: Polychrotidae) revisited: Molecular phylogeny and taxonomy of the Anolis chrysolepis species group". Bulletin of the Museum of Comparative Zoology 160 (2): 35–63.
Roze J (1958). "Los reptiles del Chimantá Tepui (Estado Bolívar, Venezuela) colectados por la expedición botánica del Chicago Natural History Musem". Acta Biológica Venezuelica 2 (25): 299–314. (Anolis eewi, new species, p. 311). (in Spanish).
Troschel FH (1848). "Amphibien ". pp. 645–661. In: Schomburgk MR (1848). Reisen in Britisch-Guiana in den Jahren 1840–44. Im Auftrage Sr. Majestät des Königs von Preussen ausgefürt, Thiel 3. Versuchs einer Fauna und Flora von Britisch-Guiana. Systematisch Bearbeitet. Leipzig: J.J. Weber. 1,260 pp. (Anolis planiceps, new species, pp. 649–650). (in German).
Vanzolini P, Williams EE (1970). "South American anoles: the geographic differentiation and evolution of the Anolis chrysolepis species group (Sauria, Iguanidae)". Arquivos de Zoologia, São Paulo 19 (1–2): 1–298. (Anolis chrysolepis planiceps, new combination, p. 85).

Anoles
Lizards of South America
Reptiles of Venezuela
Reptiles of Guyana
Reptiles of Brazil
Reptiles described in 1958
Taxa named by Franz Hermann Troschel